Tom Jacobson (born February 1, 1967) is an American politician. A Democrat, he represents District 11 in the Montana State Senate.

Political career 

In 2012, Jacobson ran for election to represent District 25 in the Montana House of Representatives, and defeated Republican incumbent Cleve Loney with 50.7% of the vote. After redistricting, Jacobson ran for, and won, election to represent District 21 in 2014. In 2016, he ran for re-election to the District 21 seat and was unopposed in both the Democratic primary and the general election.

In 2018, the incumbent State Senator for the 11th district, Republican Edward Buttrey, was unable to run for re-election due to term limits. Jacobson ran for the open seat, and faced Adam Rosendale, a former state representative from District 51, in the general election. Jacobson won with 57.5% of the vote.

As of June 2020, Jacobson sits on the following committees:
 Natural Resources
 Fish and Game
 Health and Human Services
 Finance and Claims

Electoral record 

In 2016, Jacobson won the District 21 Montana House seat unopposed.

Personal life 

Jacobson holds a Bachelor of Arts degree in Business Administration and Management from the University of Providence, and a Master of Public Administration degree from the University of Wyoming. He is single, has two children, and lives in Great Falls, Montana.

References 

Democratic Party Montana state senators
Democratic Party members of the Montana House of Representatives
Politicians from Great Falls, Montana
University of Providence alumni
University of Wyoming alumni
1967 births
Living people
21st-century American politicians